The Kauai palila or Pila's palila (Loxioides kikuchi) was a species of Hawaiian finch that was much larger than the palila (Loxioides bailleui).  It was described from subfossil remains discovered at the Makauwahi Cave on the south coast of Kauai in the Hawaiian Islands.

Extinction 
The Kauai palila was one of many native Hawaiian birds that was affected by drastic changes in the environment due to farming. The dry forest was cut down, and irrigation from streams became widespread. The ecosystem became much wetter, and the remaining naio (Myoporum sandwicense) trees began to rot away. Soon Pila's palila was pushed to its limit, and became extinct, though it had lived for a long time, despite human competition and destruction of their habitat. Some speculate that the latest remaining specimen dates back to the 1800s. Today the Kauai palila is known from a few specimens, found on the island of Kauai. The Hawai'ian name of this bird is unknown, since it seems to have disappeared before Europeans arrived to record the name.

References 

 James, Helen F, Olson, Storrs L (2006) "A new species of Hawaiian finch (Drepanidini: Loxioides) from Makauwahi Cave. " Auk'' 123(2): 335–344

Hawaiian honeycreepers
Extinct birds of Hawaii
Biota of Kauai
Carduelinae
Bird extinctions since 1500
Late Quaternary prehistoric birds
Quaternary birds of Oceania
Birds described in 2006
Taxa named by Helen F. James